Jean-Hugues Anglade (born 29 July 1955) is a French actor, film director and screenwriter, known for his roles as Eric in Killing Zoe, Zorg in Betty Blue and Marco, the boyfriend of Nikita in Nikita.

Personal life
Anglade was born in Thouars, Deux-Sèvres, Poitou-Charentes, France. His father was a vet and his mother was a social worker.

On the 21st of August 2015, Anglade was a passenger on board the Paris-bound Thalys train that suffered an attempted attack. However, the assailant was subdued by other passengers. The event resulted in injuries to four passengers, including Anglade. He cut his hand while breaking the glass on the emergency alarm.

Theatre

Filmography

References

External links

 

1955 births
2015 Thalys train attack
Living people
People from Deux-Sèvres
French male film actors
French male television actors
French National Academy of Dramatic Arts alumni
Best Supporting Actor César Award winners
French film directors
French male screenwriters
French screenwriters
20th-century French male actors
21st-century French male actors
French male stage actors